Jamshid Khilolovich Karimov (Tajik: Ҷамшед Хилолович Каримов, ; born 4 August 1940, Dushanbe) is a Tajikistani politician. He was the fifth Prime Minister of Tajikistan between 2 December 1994 and 8 February 1996. He is a cousin of former President of Uzbekistan, Islam Karimov. From 20 June 1997 to 2002 he was Tajik Ambassador to China.

Biography

Karimov was born on 4 August 1940 in Dushanbe. In 1962, he graduated from the Moscow Technological Institute of Light Industry and in 1968 from the Central Economics and Mathematics Institute of the Soviet Academy of Sciences. From 1962 to 1981 he worked as an assistant at the Department of Industrial Economics of Tajik State University. Beginning in March 1989 until the fall of the USSR, Karimov was a member of the Congress of People's Deputies of the Soviet Union. 

At the same time, he held the post of First Secretary of the Dushanbe City Committee of the Communist Party of Tajikistan. From January to July 1991, Karimov was Deputy Prime Minister, then from July to the following November, First Deputy Prime Minister. In 1994, State Adviser to the President for Social and Economic Policy. On 2 December of that, he was appointed Prime Minister, holding this position until 8 February 1996, after leading a cabinet with little powers at the time. On 9 January 1997, he was posted to the Tajik embassy in Beijing, arriving in June.

References

1940 births
Living people
People from Dushanbe
Ambassadors of Tajikistan to China
Prime Ministers of Tajikistan

Recipients of the Order of the Red Banner of Labour